Dan Anderson was an African-American man who was murdered in Macon, Mississippi, on May 20, 1927 at the age of 32. Anderson's father had also been lynched. Anderson was accused of killing T. C. Edwards, a white farmer from Cliftonville, Mississippi. He was arrested in Tuscaloosa, Alabama. A mob of 300 to 500 men followed him and fired more than 200 bullets into his body.

References

External links

1927 in Mississippi
1927 murders in the United States
Deaths by person in Mississippi
People murdered in Mississippi
Lynching deaths in Mississippi
Racially motivated violence against African Americans
Murdered African-American people
Race-related controversies in the United States
Noxubee County, Mississippi